The  is Japanese railway line between Sōja Station, Sōja and Kannabe Station, Fukuyama. This is the only railway line  operates.

History
Japanese National Railways started the construction of the line in 1966, but financial constraints halted work in 1980. The Ibara Railway Co. was established in 1986 and construction resumed under the newly founded third sector company, and the line opened on January 11, 1999, dual track and electrified as far as Kiyone.

Basic data
Operators, distances: Sōja — Kannabe; 41.7 km / 25.9 mi.
Ibara Railway (Category-1)
Kiyone — Kannabe: 38.3 km / 23.8 mi.
Ibara Railway (Category-2), West Japan Railway Company (Category-1), Japan Freight Railway Company (Category-2)
Sōja — Kiyone: 3.4 km / 2.1 mi. (Shared with Hakubi Line.)
Gauge: 1,067 mm / 3 ft. 6 in.
Stations: 15
Double-track line: Sōja — Kiyone
Electric supply: Sōja — Kiyone (1500 V DC)
All the Ibara Railway trains are DMUs.
Railway signalling
Kiyone — Kannabe: Simplified automatic
Sōja — Kiyone: Automatic

Stations

See also
List of railway companies in Japan
List of railway lines in Japan

References
This article incorporates material from the corresponding article in the Japanese Wikipedia

External links 
Official website 

Railway lines in Japan
Rail transport in Okayama Prefecture
Rail transport in Hiroshima Prefecture
Railway lines opened in 1999
Japanese third-sector railway lines
1999 establishments in Japan